The Museum of Contemporary Art (MOCA) in Tucson, Arizona, United States, was founded in 1997, by Julia Latane, James Graham, and David Wright.
The museum was founded to create a permanent institution for contemporary art in Tucson's arts district. Originally housed in the HazMat building on Toole Avenue, the museum relocated to the former fire department building on Church Avenue in 2010.

History

Toole Building 

In 1992, James Graham, Julia Latané and Dave Lewis founded the Toole Shed Studios under the auspices of the Tucson Arts Coalition (TAC). MOCA was incorporated in the spring of 1997. It was conceived as the next step in the continued growth and development of the Toole Shed Artists’ Studios and as an important addition to the downtown Arts District. In order to better serve the interests of the tenants and the community, and responding to the wealth of local contemporary art activity, the artists of Toole Shed Studios decided to incorporate as an independent cooperative. The articles of incorporation and bylaws were written in 1997 and 501(c)3 status was received by the end of that year. Graham was the Founding Director of MOCA, and Latané served as President of the board with David Wright (founder of Sixth Congress Gallery) as Secretary and Treasurer.

During the spring of 1998, the foundations for MOCA were laid. In August 1998 the opportunity arose to occupy a warehouse space at 191 East Toole Avenue. Over the course of the next four months, volunteer labor and many hours of hard work transformed this derelict warehouse into the Museum of Contemporary Art, with over four thousand square feet of exhibition space.

Between 2001 and 2003,local gallery owner Elizabeth Cherry served as interim director and curator, and in March 2003, the position of Executive Director and Chief Curator was appointed to Anne-Marie Russell and in 2017 Ginger Shulick Porcella became the new Executive Director and Chief Curator of MOCA.

Fire Station 
In 2009, Tucson’s Fire Station #1 was decommissioned and the firefighters moved to a new facility. An request for proposal for “highest and best use” was issued and MOCA Tucson saw this as a dual opportunity to obtain a permanent facility and to preserve an important part of Arizona’s modernist architectural history. The main hall originally used for fire trucks became the main exhibition space; the first-floor offices were transformed into white-box galleries for display of intimate work; the firefighters’ quarters became artist-in-residence accommodations; second story offices were adapted into the education space and administrative offices for the museum. Since 2009, MOCA has mounted eight to twelve exhibitions per year presenting work by locally, regionally, nationally and internationally known artists. MOCA has established an Artist-in-Residence Program, youth programming targeted at underserved populations, a robust public programming calendar including ArtNow!, Artist Talk series, dance, performance, music and other events celebrating the arts.

Exhibits

Fundraisers 
MOCA Tucson has two large fundraisers a year: an annual Gala and a Fall Fundraiser. Every two years, the gala features the Local Genius Awards, honoring visionary and innovative Tucsonans whose activities have a global impact and whose talents have been internationally recognized.

Residency Programs

Artist-in-Residence Program 
MOCA Tucson has a competitive artist residency program that was relaunched through a public application process in 2017, receiving several hundred applications for just seven annual slots lasting between two weeks and three months. Selected artists receive private studio and housing space, studio visits with curators, production stipends and PR support, as well as an opportunity to present a public program, exhibition, or lecture at the museum.

Curator-in-Residence Program 
MOCA recently launched a Curator-in Residence Program starting in 2019 with the first Curator-in-Residence, Alex Young. Selected museum professionals will be given a three-month residency and MOCA will provide time, space, and access to resources for a curator to develop an exhibition, conduct research, and engage with MOCA Tucson’s artists-in-residence.

References

External links 
 MOCA website
 https://web.archive.org/web/20110208210625/http://www.thezmag.com/article-162-moca-then-now.html
 http://www.tucsonweekly.com/tucson/moca-rising/Content?oid=1080015
 https://web.archive.org/web/20101026050650/http://archpaper.com/e-board_rev.asp?News_ID=4323
 https://archive.today/20130205012948/http://tucsoncitizen.com/art/tag/moca/
 http://www.tucsonsentinel.com/arts/report/020810_mocagala

Art museums established in 1996
Art museums and galleries in Arizona
Museums in Tucson, Arizona
Contemporary art galleries in the United States
Museum of Contemporary Art, Tucson